1332 Marconia, provisional designation , is a dark asteroid and the parent body of the Marconia family located in the outer regions of the asteroid belt. The asteroid was discovered on 9 January 1934, by Italian astronomer Luigi Volta at the Observatory of Turin in Pino Torinese, northern Italy. It was named for Italian electrical engineer Guglielmo Marconi. The uncommon L-type asteroid has a rotation period of 19.2 hours.

Orbit and classification 

Marconia is the parent body of the Marconia family, a tiny asteroid family of less than 50 known members. It orbits the Sun in the outer asteroid belt at a distance of 2.7–3.5 AU once every 5 years and 4 months (1,958 days; semi-major axis of 3.06 AU). Its orbit has an eccentricity of 0.13 and an inclination of 2° with respect to the ecliptic.

Physical characteristics 

Marconia has been characterized as an L-type asteroid in the Bus–DeMeo taxonomic system, while in the SMASS classification, it is an Ld-subtype that transitions between the L-type and D-type asteroids. The overall spectral type for members of the Marconia family is that of a carbonaceous C-type and X-type.

Rotation period and poles 

In September 2012, a first rotational lightcurve of Marconia was obtained from photometric observations by Robert Stephens at his Santana Observatory  in California. Lightcurve analysis gave a well-defined rotation period of 19.16 hours with a brightness variation of 0.30 magnitude.

A 2016-published lightcurve, using modeled photometric data from the Lowell Photometric Database, gave a concurring sidereal period of 19.2264 hours, as well as a spin axes of (37.0°, 31.0°) and (220.0°, 31.0°) in ecliptic coordinates (λ, β). Conversely, another lightcurve inversion study by an international collaboration gave a longer spin rate of 32.1201 hours.

Diameter and albedo 

According to the surveys carried out by the Japanese Akari satellite and the NEOWISE mission of NASA's Wide-field Infrared Survey Explorer, Marconia measures between 44.93 and 52.009 kilometers in diameter and its surface has an albedo between 0.04 and 0.063.

The Collaborative Asteroid Lightcurve Link derives an albedo of 0.0527 and a diameter of 43.90 kilometers based on an absolute magnitude of 10.6.

Naming 

This minor planet was named after Guglielmo Marconi (1874–1937), an Italian electrical engineer, pioneer and inventor of radio. In 1909, he received the Nobel Prize in Physics together with Karl Ferdinand Braun (also see ). The official naming citation was mentioned in The Names of the Minor Planets by Paul Herget in 1955. The lunar crater Marconi was also named in his honor.

References

External links 
 Asteroid Lightcurve Database (LCDB), query form (info )
 Dictionary of Minor Planet Names, Google books
 Asteroids and comets rotation curves, CdR – Observatoire de Genève, Raoul Behrend
 Discovery Circumstances: Numbered Minor Planets (1)-(5000) – Minor Planet Center
 
 

001332
Discoveries by Luigi Volta
Named minor planets
1332 Marconia
001332
19340109